The Cardiac Arrhythmia Suppression Trial (CAST) was a double-blind, randomized, controlled study designed to test the hypothesis that suppression of premature ventricular complexes (PVC) with class I antiarrhythmic agents after a myocardial infarction (MI) would reduce mortality. It was conducted between 1986 and 1989 and included over 1700 patients in 27 centres. The study found that the tested drugs increased mortality instead of lowering it as was expected. The publication of these results in 1991/92, in combination with large follow-up studies for drugs that had not been tested in CAST, led to a paradigm shift in the treatment of MI patients. Class I and III antiarrhythmics are now only used with extreme caution after MI, or they are contraindicated completely. Heart Rhythm Society Distinguished Scientist D. George Wyse was a member of the CAST trial's steering and executive committees.

Background
The study was prompted by the fact that patients who suffer from myocardial infarctions (MIs) have a high risk of sudden death, presumably due to arrhythmia. Around the time of the study onset (1986), an estimated 8 to 15% of patients would die in the subsequent year following an MI, with about half of those deaths resulting from arrhythmia. This warranted the investigation as to whether PVC suppression could improve outcomes in post-MI patients. The trial was conducted by the National Heart, Lung, and Blood Institute.

Study design
CAST was a multicenter, double-blind, randomized, controlled trial. Patients were randomized to drug therapy or placebo if they met these criteria: They had a myocardial infarction occurring six days to two years prior to the onset of the study, and they had asymptomatic ventricular premature beats, detected by Holter monitor, which could be suppressed by either encainide, flecainide, or moracizine in an open-label design. A total of 1727 subjects who responded were randomized, 1455 to encainide, flecainide, or placebo, and 272 to moracizine or placebo. The primary endpoint was sudden cardiac death, and the secondary endpoint was all-cause mortality. 

The second Cardiac Arrhythmia Suppression Trial (CAST II) modified the enrollment criteria to include patients at higher risk for serious arrhythmia. This included 1) patients enrolled within 4 to 90 days of a previous MI, 2) a left ventricular ejection fraction lower than 40%, 3) prior to enrollment, suppression of PVCs had occurred with the drugs (vs. placebo) using a double-blinded design, and 4) patients having more serious arrhythmias would also be included.

Results
The drugs used (encainide, flecainide, and moracizine) successfully reduced the amount of PVCs, but led to more arrhythmia-related deaths. Total mortality was significantly higher with both encainide and flecainide at a mean follow-up period of 10 months. Within about two years after enrollment, encainide and flecainide were discontinued because of increased mortality and sudden cardiac death. CAST II compared moracizine to placebo, but was also stopped because of early (within two weeks) cardiac death in the moracizine group, and long-term survival seemed highly unlikely. The excess mortality was attributed to proarrhythmic effects of the agents.
Class I antiarrhythmics are proarrhythmic during heart ischemia in animals.

References

External links 
 

Clinical trials related to cardiology
Antiarrhythmic agents